Braňo Prieložný (born 9 May 1968) is a Slovak bobsledder. He competed in the four man event at the 2002 Winter Olympics.

References

1968 births
Living people
Slovak male bobsledders
Olympic bobsledders of Slovakia
Bobsledders at the 2002 Winter Olympics
Sportspeople from Bratislava